The Silcock Family is a family from Huntington Beach, California, United States, consisting of many adopted, disabled boys and two parents, now divorced. , the Silcock Family had adopted 59 sons. They have recorded music, and performed in one episode of Nanny 911.

Biography 
A diving accident in 1987 resulted in the father, Jim Silcock, becoming a quadriplegic with minimal mobility. The mother, Ann Belles, had been involved in foster parenting since she was 19 years old.

The couple first met on the internet. They met in-person for the first time in January 1998 and got married four months later.

The parents own a small business called First Step Supported Living, which helps disabled persons live independent lives.  With governmental financial aid given to some of the boys, along with donations from the community, the family is able to support itself financially.

The Silcocks adopt children who have disabilities and are of different ethnicities.  They feel that such children are the most overlooked amongst adoption agencies and therefore have the most trouble getting adopted.

Divorce
Ann Belles and Jim Silcock had an uncontested divorce in 2011, which the divorce mediator characterized as friendly, quick, and focused on the needs of their sons.

In popular culture

The family is best known for being featured in an episode of the former Fox reality television series Nanny 911.  Because the family was so big, all three nannies were summoned to visit them.

California-based singer-songwriter Dave Nachmanoff, who is also the sideman to Al Stewart ("Year of the Cat", "Time Passages"), has recorded three CDs with the family, with the boys writing each of the songs with him.

Barry Silcock was profiled in an episode of An Adoption Story, which aired on Discovery Health Channel. This episode features Barry, Jim, and Ann appearing in a family court to finalize Barry's adoption by Jim and Ann after Barry reached the age of majority.

References 

Silcock Family
American people with disabilities